The Moral Arc: How Science Leads Humanity Toward Truth, Justice, and Freedom is a 2015 book by Michael Shermer. Steven Pinker describes the book as a sequel to The Better Angels of Our Nature.

In his book — which took four years to research and write, and is named after a quotation from Martin Luther King Jr.'s famous "How Long, Not Long" speech, the idea having been coined by transcendentalist and Unitarian minister Theodore Parker (1810–1860) that the arc of the moral universe "is a long one" but "it bends towards justice" — Shermer argues that the rise of trade and rise of literacy through the Industrial Revolution's need for highly educated knowledge workers, has created a "moral Flynn effect" and led to cultures with lower rates of violent crime. Shermer argues that the rise of full democracies around the world, combined with the spread of human rights and civil liberties has led to greater human flourishing. Shermer has stated that "[my] thesis is not for inevitable moral progress, we have to earn it, fight for it and argue for it." He also stated that he used "a lot of Utilitarian thinking, but in the end, the individual natural rights to survive and [the] flourish[ing] of sentient beings, [are] what counts".

Shermer criticises historical religious justifications for slavery, cruelty to animals, misogyny and homophobia, and writes that the spread of scientific and enlightened values has created a better foundation for civil society.

External links
ReasonTV
MSNBC interview
LA Times op-ed
libertarianism.org

See also
 War Before Civilization
 The Better Angels of Our Nature
 The Rational Optimist: How Prosperity Evolves

References

2015 non-fiction books
English-language books
Books by Michael Shermer
Philosophy of science
Henry Holt and Company books